Zook Spur is a former unincorporated community at the border of Dallas County and Polk County, in the U.S. state of Iowa. It was at the corner of what is now NW 158th Avenue and Iowa State Highway 17.

History
Zook Spur (or Zookspur) was a mining community, and was named after mining superintendent H. Zook. The Scandia Coal Company operated six mines in the area between 1906 and 1943.

Zook Spur was a company town, but had a school, churches, a baseball diamond, a pool hall, a bakery, and the company store. The town was located on the Milwaukee Railroad.

Zook Spur's population was 520 in 1925. A number of cabins were on Zook Spur Place, south of the main intersection. Zook Spur prospered into the 1930s. The 1943 closure of the mines ended Zook Spur's growth.

In 1948, the Zook Spur school district closed, and the school building was put up for sale.

By 1975, little remained of the original community, aside from a few houses and the building where the Zook Spur bakery was located.

References

Unincorporated communities in Dallas County, Iowa
Unincorporated communities in Polk County, Iowa
Unincorporated communities in Iowa